Paul Hoen (born December 28, 1961) is an American film director and producer. He is best known for his directorial work with Nickelodeon and Disney Channel, especially his direction of Disney Channel Original Movies. He has directed and produced projects such as The Cheetah Girls: One World (2008), Camp Rock 2: The Final Jam (2010), Zombies (2018) and Zombies 2 (2020) and Zombies 3 (2022) 

Hoen studied drama, film and television at the University of Santa Clara. He was admitted to the Directors Guild of America in 1987. Since then he has directed several television films such as Jump In, Read It and Weep, Eddie's Million Dollar Cook-Off, You Wish!, Tru Confessions starring Shia LaBeouf and the comedy The Luck of the Irish starring Ryan Merriman. Both Jump In and Luck of the Irish on first airing were the Disney Channel's highest rated programs.

Hoen has won two DGA awards for the films Jump In and Let It Shine. He has also been nominated for three other DGA awards for the films Camp Rock 2: The Final Jam, "Take My Sister Please", an episode from the series Even Stevens, and Searching for David's Heart, the ABC Family Movie starring Danielle Panabaker. The film was also nominated for a Young Artist Award for Best Family Television Movie or Special and Danielle Panabaker won the Young Artist Award for Best Young Actress in a TV Movie. The film was also the 2005 recipient of The Humanitas Prize. You Wish! and Jump In were also nominated for Humanitas Prizes.

Popular series directed by Hoen include Roundhouse, The Secret World of Alex Mack, Sabrina, the Teenage Witch, Cousin Skeeter, The Jersey, where he is also credited as Producer, Just for Kicks, Ned's Declassified School Survival Guide, Just Jordan, the N series Beyond the Break, and South of Nowhere, which was nominated for a GLADD Award for Best Teen Drama. Hoen has also directed two successful pilots for Nickelodeon, The Journey of Allen Strange and 100 Deeds for Eddie McDowd.  He was also the director and executive producer of the Disney Channel series starring the Jonas Brothers, Jonas.

In 2011, Hoen was the Executive Producer and Director of the Madison High Pilot, an unsuccessful attempt by  Disney  to reinvigorate their High School Musical franchise. In 2012 he won his second DGA award for the movie "Let It Shine featuring,  Coco Jones, and Tyler James Williams (Everybody Hates Chris).  As well he directed the popular christmas movie on ABC family, "The Mistle-Tones"  starring Tia Mowry and Tori Spelling.

He has also directed the movies: "Cloud 9" Starring Luke Benward of Minutemen and Dove Cameron of (Liv and Maddie), "How to Build a Better Boy" starring China Anne McClain "A.N.T. Farm" Kelli Berglund "Lab Rats" and starring Rowan Blanchard of (Girl Meets World), "Invisible Sister" More recently, he was the main director for the hit show, "Andi Mack" about a young girl who discovers her sister is actually her mother.

References

External links

American film directors
American television directors
American television producers
Living people
Santa Clara University alumni
Place of birth missing (living people)
Directors Guild of America Award winners
1961 births